The Limpopo burrowing skink (Scelotes limpopoensis) is a lizard species found in the Limpopo River valley in South Africa.

This species lost the forelimbs entirely and the hind limbs are reduced to only two digits.

Taxonomy

There are two sub-species:
 Scelotes limpopoensis albiventris JACOBSEN 1987 - first described in the Langjan Nature Reserve
 Scelotes limpopoensis limpopoensis FITZSIMONS 1930

Although both sub-species occupy a similar habitat the range of S. l. albiventris is smaller than S. l. limpopoensis and they have not been discovered in sympatry, and may probably be a full species.

References

External links
 biodiversityexplorer.org

Scelotes
Reptiles of South Africa
Skinks of Africa
Reptiles described in 1930
Taxa named by Vivian Frederick Maynard FitzSimons
Lizards of Africa